Teresa Venerdì is a 1941 Italian "white-telephones" comedy film directed by Vittorio De Sica.

Cast
Vittorio De Sica ...  Il dottore Pietro Vignali 
Adriana Benetti ...  Teresa Venerdì 
Irasema Dilián ...  Lilli Passalacqua 
Guglielmo Barnabò ...  Agostino Passalacqua 
Olga Vittoria Gentilli ...  Rosa Passalacqua 
Anna Magnani ...  Maddalena Tentini/Loretta Prima 
Elvira Betrone ...  La direttrice dell'orfanotrofio 
Giuditta Rissone ...  L'istitutrice Anna 
Virgilio Riento ...  Antonio 
Annibale Betrone ...  Umberto Vignali 
Nico Pepe ...  Il dottore Pasquale Grosso 
Clara Auteri Pepe ...  Giuseppina 
Zaira La Fratta ...  Alice 
Alessandra Adari ...  L'istitutrice Caterina 
Lina Marengo ...  La maestra Ricci

See also
Rézi Friday (1938)

External links
 

1941 films
1940s Italian-language films
Films set in Rome
Films directed by Vittorio De Sica
Italian black-and-white films
1941 comedy films
Italian remakes of foreign films
Remakes of Hungarian films
Films with screenplays by Cesare Zavattini
Italian comedy films
1940s Italian films